Bill & Ted's Excellent Adventures is a 1990 animated television series spin-off from the 1989 film of the same title, following the misadventures of two time-travelling slackers as they travel into the distant past and future.

As in the film, the show features two dim-witted teenage musicians, Bill and Ted, who are visited by Rufus, a man from the future, who needs them to graduate from high school in order to start a rock band that inspires the people of the future. They travel to various time periods, making sure that history happens as it should, more or less.

Overview
The first season of the animated series was produced by Hanna-Barbera and aired on CBS in 1990, with Keanu Reeves, Alex Winter, George Carlin, and Bernie Casey reprising their film roles.

For the second season in 1991, the animated series switched production companies and networks, now airing on Fox Kids, and produced by DIC Animation City. As Fox was also planning on airing a new live-action version series with the same name, the cast was replaced, and the leads were now voiced by Evan Richards and Christopher Kennedy, the actors who would go on to portray Bill and Ted on the short-lived 1992 live-action television series. The new episodes introduced a "Squint" phone booth that could take Bill and Ted into literature, television shows, and (after shrinking them) inside the human body. The new show had trouble catching on, and after one more season, the animated Bill & Ted series was cancelled.

Cast

Hanna-Barbera version (1990)
 Keanu Reeves as Ted "Theodore" Logan
 Alex Winter as Bill S. Preston, Esq.
 George Carlin as Rufus
 Bernie Casey as Mr. Ryan
 Danny Cooksey as Deacon Logan
 Peter Renaday as Detective Logan

Additional voices

DiC version (1991)
 Evan Richards as Bill S. Preston, Esq.
 Christopher Kennedy as Ted "Theodore" Logan
 Rick Overton as Rufus

Additional voices

Episodes

Season 1 (1990)

Season 2 (1991)

This season featured historical characters like Giacomo Casanova, Elvis Presley, Theodoric and Martin Luther.

Home media
The first episode of the first season was released as a special feature on the Bill & Ted's Most Excellent Collection DVD box set, and on the Blu-ray of Bill & Ted's Excellent Adventure.

In 2013, TGG Direct, LLC (under license from MGM Home Entertainment) released a 2 disc "Best of" DVD. Disc 1 includes eight episodes from Season 1, while Disc 2 has the complete second season. It was a Wal-Mart exclusive at first, but now it's available nationwide.

References

External links
 
 
 Bill and Ted's Excellent Online Adventure

1990 American television series debuts
1991 American television series endings
1990s American animated television series
1990 Canadian television series debuts
1991 Canadian television series endings
1990s Canadian animated television series
Bill & Ted
The Funtastic World of Hanna-Barbera
American children's animated adventure television series
American children's animated comic science fiction television series
American animated television spin-offs
Canadian children's animated adventure television series
Canadian children's animated comic science fiction television series
Canadian animated television spin-offs
English-language television shows
Television series by MGM Television
Television series by DIC Entertainment
Television series set in the future
Animated television shows based on films
American time travel television series
Animation based on real people
Anime-influenced Western animated television series
Television series by Hanna-Barbera
1990s American time travel television series
Television series set in 1990
Teen animated television series